Ihn is a village in Wallerfangen municipality, Saarlouis district, Germany. Until the end of 1973, it was an independent municipality.

Former municipalities in Saarland
Saarlouis (district)